is a city located in Yamanashi Prefecture, Japan. ,  the city had an estimated population of 34,738 in 14,679 households, and a population density of 120 persons per km2.

Geography
Yamanashi City is located in north-central Yamanashi Prefecture in the northeastern end of the Kofu Basin. The city is flat in the south, rising toward mountains to the north. The Fuefuki River flows through the city.

Neighboring municipalities
Yamanashi Prefecture
Fuefuki, Kōfu, Kōshū
Saitama Prefecture
Chichibu
Nagano Prefecture
Minamisaku District: Kawakami

Climate
The city has a Humid continental climate characterized by characterized by hot and humid summers, and relatively severe winters (Köppen climate classification Dfb).  The average annual temperature in Yamanashi is 6.4 °C. The average annual rainfall is 1834 mm with September as the wettest month. The temperatures are highest on average in August, at around 18.7 °C, and lowest in January, at around -5.5 °C.

Demographics
Per Japanese census data, the population of Yamanashi has been in decline since the year 2000.

History
The village of Yamanashi was founded on July 1, 1942, by the merger of two hamlets within Higashiyamanashi District. It was elevated to city status on July 1, 1954.

On March 22, 2005, Yamanashi absorbed the town of Makioka, and the village of Mitomi (both from Higashiyamanashi District).

Government
Yamanashi has a mayor-council form of government with a directly elected mayor and a unicameral city legislature of 16 members.

Economy
The economy of Yamanashi is based primarily on horticulture, with grapes and peaches as the main cash crops.

Education
Yamanashi has 12 public elementary schools and three public middle schools operated by the city government and two public high schools operated by the Yamanashi Prefectural Board of Education.

Gallery

Transportation

Railway
 East Japan Railway Company -  Chūō Main Line 
  -

Highway

Sister cities
 - Sioux City, Iowa, USA – since November 6, 2003
 – Xiaoshan District, Hangzhou, Zhejiang, China – since October 14, 1993 (friendship city)

Local attractions
 Seihaku-ji – Buddhist temple
 Oimatakubo-Hachiman-gu
Fuefukigawa Fruit Park

Notable people
Kazufumi Miyazawa - musician, founder of rock band The Boom.
Nezu Kaichirō - Meiji era industrialist, politician and philanthropist. Founder of the Nezu Museum.
Jumbo Tsuruta – professional wrestler
Tetsuya Matsumoto – professional baseball player
 Masahiko Kobe - celebrity chef, known for specializing in Italian cuisine, and known as "Iron Chef Italian" in Iron Chef
 Shirō Sano - actor

References

External links

Official website 

 
Cities in Yamanashi Prefecture